Fay Craig is a former international lawn bowls competitor for Australia.

Bowls career
Craig won the pairs gold medal with Merle Richardson and the fours silver medal at the 1985 World Outdoor Bowls Championship in Melbourne, Australia. 

She won two silver medals at the Asia Pacific Bowls Championships at Tweed Heads, New South Wales.

Craig was inducted into the Bowls Australia Hall of Fame.

References

Living people
Year of birth missing (living people)
Australian female bowls players
Bowls World Champions
20th-century Australian women